The San Francisco Dons men's soccer team represents the University of San Francisco in all men's Division I NCAA competitions. They compete in the West Coast Conference and have previously won national championships in 1966, 1975, 1976, and 1980. They are coached by Chris Brown, who was hired in May 2021.

Honors 
California Intercollegiate Soccer Conference (11): 1932, 1933, 1934, 1935, 1948, 1949, 1950, 1951, 1952, 1953, 1954

Notable alumni 

 Koulis Apostolidis
 John Doyle
 Josh Hansen
 Mike Ivanow
 Brandon McDonald
 Alejandro Toledo

References

External links

 

 
San Francisco Dons